The women's hammer throw at the 2019 World Athletics Championships was held at the Khalifa International Stadium in Doha from 27 to 28 September 2019.

Summary
In the absence of world record holder Anita Włodarczyk, who has dominated hammer throwing since 2012, this was the first major championship opportunity for someone else. The next thrower into the ring was Włodarczyk's Polish teammate Joanna Fiodorow, who tried to pick up the slack, throwing her personal best 76.35m which dominated everybody else. Zalina Petrivskaya's first throw of the competition was dropped to third place after the first three throwers. She maintained that position until the middle of the fifth round when Wang Zheng's 74.76m grabbed bronze.

Records
Before the competition records were as follows:

Qualification standard
The standard to qualify automatically for entry was 71.00 m.

Schedule
The event schedule, in local time (UTC+3), was as follows:

Results

Qualification
Qualification: Qualifying Performance 72.00 (Q) or at least 12 best performers (q) advanced to the final.

Final
The final was started on 28 September at 19:25.

References

Hammer throw
Hammer throw at the World Athletics Championships